Leština u Světlé is a municipality and village in Havlíčkův Brod District in the Vysočina Region of the Czech Republic. It has about 500 inhabitants.

Administrative parts
Villages of Dobrnice, Štěpánov and Vrbice are administrative parts of Leština u Světlé.

References

Villages in Havlíčkův Brod District